Corbeau News Centrafrique is a French-language news site from the Central African Republic.

The website was created in June 2014 by Alain Nzilo, a journalist from the Central African Republic. The site employs multiple reporters in different provinces of the country. The site has been noted for its anti-Russian sentiment and it has multiple times reported about the presence and activities of Russian mercenaries in the Central African Republic. The Russian embassy in the country has labelled the station as "anti-Russian propaganda". As of February 2021 the site has been blocked by the Central African government. The site owner has been reportedly contacted by Russian  paramilitaries with the aim of changing his editorial policies.

References

Sources 
 Who are we? - Corbeau News Centrafrique

External links 

 
 
 

Mass media in the Central African Republic